The 1952 Fordham Rams football team represented Fordham University as an independent during the 1952 college football season. The Rams went 2–5–1 and amassed 151 points while their defense allowed 119 points.

Schedule

References

Fordham
Fordham Rams football seasons
Fordham Rams football